Acacia froggattii is a shrub of the genus Acacia and the subgenus Plurinerves that is endemic to an area in north western Australia

Description
Like most species of Acacia it has phyllodes rather than true leaves. The leathery and hairy phyllodes have three obscure nerves. It blooms from July to November and produces yellow flowers.

Taxonomy
The species was first formally described by the botanist Joseph Maiden in 1920 as part of the work Notes on Acacias, No. IV, with descriptions of new species as published in the Journal and Proceedings of the Royal Society of New South Wales. It was reclassified as Racosperma froggattii in 1987 by Leslie Pedley then transferred back to genus Acacia in 2001.

Distribution
It is native to an area in the Northern Territory and the Kimberley  region of Western Australia where it is commonly situated on hillsides and among rocky outcrops growing in gravelly skeletal soils in and around areas of quartzite and sandstone. The range of the shrub extends over the rugged hills of the Isdell Range, Artesian Range and Phillips Ranges in Western Australia and the Fitzroy Range of the Northern Territory as a part of shrubland and open woodland communities.

See also
 List of Acacia species

References

froggattii
Acacias of Western Australia
Flora of the Northern Territory
Taxa named by Joseph Maiden
Plants described in 1920